The men's triple jump event at the 2003 Asian Athletics Championships was held in Manila, Philippines on September 20–22.

Medalists

Results

Qualification

Final

References

2003 Asian Athletics Championships
Triple jump at the Asian Athletics Championships